Qolora Mouth is a town in Amathole District Municipality in the Eastern Cape province of South Africa.

A small resort at the mouth of the Qolora River, it is located in the vicinity of the pool of Nongqawuse, the Xhosa prophetess, and the wreck of the Jacaranda, which foundered on 18 September 1971 on the rocks off the coast.

References

Populated places in the Mnquma Local Municipality
Tourist attractions in the Eastern Cape